Kalden "Kelly" Sonam Dorji (born 4 January 1971) is a Bhutanese actor, model, and artist who works primarily in Indian movies.

Early life
Dorji's father is Lynpo Paljor Dorji, widely known as Dasho Benji, the permanent advisor to Bhutan's National Environment Commission. His mother is Louise Dorji, an author of children's books and a founding member of Bhutan Broadcasting Service (BBS). Dorji attended St. Paul's School in Darjeeling and Sherubtse College in eastern Bhutan. He earned an honors degree in history at St. Xavier's College in Mumbai. Dorji's grandfather was Bhutanese Prime Minister Jigme Palden Dorji. Dorji is a member of the Dorji Family of Bhutan and descendant of the Sikkim Royal Family.

Career

Modeling
Kelly Dorji rose to prominence as a fashion model in the late-1990s and early 2000s in India. He worked as a runway model in India for designers such as Shahab Durazi, JJ Valaya, Arun Khanna, Rohit Bal, and Tarun Tahiliani and as a print model in London for Models Out of Town. Dorji hosted English television show 'Star Biz' for Star TV with co-anchor Lisa Ray.

Acting
Kelly Dorji has acted in almost 30 films over the course of his career. He made his acting debut in 2005 as the main antagonist opposite Ajay Devgan and Bobby Deol in Mani Shankar's Tango Charlie. In 2008, Dorji moved to the Telugu film industry where he gained recognition for films such as the 2007 action hit Don opposite Nagarjuna and Ek Ka Dum opposite Mahesh Babu. Dorji has also been influential in boosting the popularity of Bhutanese films in his own country with the release of his Dzongkha film Sem Gawai Tasha in 2011.

Dorji is well known for his own film stunts, much of which were self-choreographed. He also designed sequences for pageants, and assisted choreographer Lubna Adam. After a near death accident in 2013, Dorji limits his stunt work in films but continues to act.

Art
Kelly Dorji is a painter and photographer. He has studied painting with a number of artists including Elsie Evans, Sidharth, and Karma Wangdi. He studied photography with fashion photographer Chien-Wien Lee. Dorji exhibits his work at contemporary art gallery Gray Area in Thimphu, Bhutan.

Personal life
Dorji dated Bollywood actress Lara Dutta for 9 years before their relationship came to an end in 2007

He currently lives in Thimphu, Bhutan. He owns a luxury travel company, Terton Travel Bhutan.

Service
Dorji supports the Bhutanese contemporary art sector more broadly as an advisor on the board of the Voluntary Artist's Studio of Thimphu (VAST). Dorji serves an executive board member for the Tarayana Foundation. An avid enduro motorcyclist, Dorji rides for charity with the Tarayana Dragons.

Filmography

References

External links
 
 Kelly Dorji at Penguin India

Bhutanese male actors
Bhutanese expatriates in India
Living people
Bhutanese Buddhists
People from Thimphu
Male actors from Mumbai
Male actors in Hindi cinema
Male actors in Tamil cinema
St. Xavier's College, Mumbai alumni
St. Paul's School, Darjeeling alumni
1971 births